Trindade is a municipality in the state of Pernambuco, Brazil. The estimated population in 2021, according to the Brazilian Institute of Geography and Statistics (IBGE) was 31,103 inhabitants and the total area is 295.77 km².

Geography

 State - Pernambuco
 Region - Sertão Pernambucano
 Boundaries - Araripina   (N and W);  Ouricuri   (S);  Ouricuri and Ipubi  (E).
 Area - 229.57 km²
 Elevation - 518 m
 Hydrography - Brigida River
 Vegetation - Caatinga  hiperxerófila
 Climate - semi arid - (Sertão) hot
 Annual average temperature - 24.9 c
 Distance to Recife - 645 km
Population at last census (2010) - 26,116

Economy
The main economic activities in Trindade are based in no metallic (gypsum)  industry, commerce and agribusiness, especially creation of cattle, goats, sheep, pigs, chickens;  and plantations of manioc. Trindade is located in the micro region of Araripina, which contains 95% of the Brazilian reserves of gypsum.

Economic Indicators

Economy by Sector
2006

Health Indicators

References

Municipalities in Pernambuco